Sergio Carlos Gutiérrez Luna (born 12 July 1976) is a Mexican politician. He is  serving from 1 September 2021 to 31 August 2022 President of the Chamber of Deputies.

References 

Living people
1976 births
21st-century Mexican politicians
Deputies of the LXIV Legislature of Mexico
Deputies of the LXV Legislature of Mexico
People from Veracruz
Morena (political party) politicians
Presidents of the Chamber of Deputies (Mexico)
Members of the Chamber of Deputies (Mexico) for the State of Mexico